James R. Curran is a computational linguist and senior lecturer at the University of Sydney. He holds a PhD in Informatics from the University of Edinburgh.

Research

Curran's research focuses on natural language processing, making him one of the few Australian computational linguists. Specifically Curran's research has focused on the area of natural language processing known as combinatory categorial grammar parsing. In addition to his contributions to NLP, Curran has produced a paper on the development of search engines to assist in driving problem based learning.

Within NLP, he has published papers on combinatory categorial grammar parsing as well as question answering systems.

Works

Curran has co-authored software packages such as C&C tools, a CCG parser (with Stephen Clark).

Educational work

In addition to his work as a University of Sydney lecturer, Curran directs the National Computer Science School, an annual summer school for technologically talented high school students.  In 2013, based on their work with NCSS, he and a number of other organisers founded Grok Learning.

Curran is also an advocate for embedding computational literacy in the general curriculum, participating in the development of Australia's National Digital Curriculum and presenting the "Python for Every Child in Australia" keynote at PyCon Australia 2014.

References

External links
Homepage at the University of Sydney

University of Sydney alumni
Living people
Year of birth missing (living people)
Natural language processing researchers
Computational linguistics researchers